Nebria heegeri is a species of ground beetle in the Nebriinae subfamily that is endemic to Chornagora, and Gorgany Mountains of Ukraine. The males are brown coloured, while the females are black.

References

External links
Nebria heegeri at Fauna Europaea

haida
Beetles described in 1826
Beetles of Europe
Endemic fauna of Ukraine